The Yuma Valley Railway was a heritage railroad in Arizona, which formerly operated an excursion passenger train on the rail line following the Colorado River levee between Yuma and Gadsden. The railroad's train has not operated since 2005, when the line was embargoed by the Bureau of Reclamation. The equipment had been parked idle across the canal and south of the Yuma Quartermaster Depot; at least one passenger car was relocated to the Virginia and Truckee Railroad in May 2013.

Motive Power and Rolling Stock
1943 USMC GE 44-ton switcher Center Cab Diesel
1957 GE 65-ton switcher Center Cab Diesel
1952 U.S. Army Davenport-Besler
1922 Pullman chair car (Apache Railway)
1923 Pullman club car/U.S. Army ambulance car
1950 Pullman chair car

History
The YVRY was originally owned by the U.S. Department of the Interior's Bureau of Reclamation.  It was part of the Interior Department's irrigation and flood control project along the levee of the Colorado River.

The U.S. Government's railroad was known as the Yuma Valley Railroad and operated from 1914 and into the 1980s.  The Yuma Valley Railroad originally extended 25 miles from Yuma to the Arizona/Mexico border town of San Luis.  In 1947 the Yuma Valley Railroad was leased to and operated by the Southern Pacific Railroad, at which time the 9 miles from Gadsden to San Luis were idle and later abandoned.

References

Heritage railroads in Arizona
Yuma, Arizona
Transportation in Yuma County, Arizona
History of Yuma County, Arizona